Ernst Laemmle (1900–1950) was a German screenwriter and film director. He was the nephew of Universal Pictures founder Carl Laemmle and like many of his relatives he was brought over to America to work for the studio. Ernst directed a number of short western films during the silent era. He also directed films for Universal's German subsidiary.

During the 1930s he worked as Universal's foreign dialogue supervisor. He was the brother of director Edward Laemmle who was also employed by Universal.

Selected filmography

Director
 The Sunset Trail (1924)
 The Phantom of the Opera (1925)(Uncredited)
 Prowlers of the Night (1926)
 A One Man Game (1927)
 Red Clay (1927)
 Range Courage (1927)
The Broncho Buster (1927)
 The Grip of the Yukon (1928)
 Phyllis of the Follies (1928)
 The Unusual Past of Thea Carter (1929)
 The Daredevil Reporter (1929)
 What Men Want (1930)

Screenwriter
 The Palm Beach Story (1942)
 The Great Moment (1944)

References

Bibliography 
 Jacobs, Diane. Christmas in July: The Life and Art of Preston Sturges. University of California Press, 1992.

External links 
Antonia Carlotta's Official Family YouTube Channel
 

1900 births
1950 deaths
Film people from Munich
20th-century German Jews
German emigrants to the United States